This is a list of nuclear weapons listed according to country of origin, and then by type within the states.

The United States

US nuclear weapons of all types – bombs, warheads, shells, and others – are numbered in the same sequence starting with the Mark 1 and  ending with the W-91 (which was canceled prior to introduction into service). All designs which were formally intended to be weapons at some point received a number designation. Pure test units which were experiments (and not intended to be weapons) are not numbered in this sequence.

Early weapons were very large and could only be used as free fall bombs. These were known by "Mark" designators, like the Mark 4 which was a development of the Fat Man weapon. As weapons became more sophisticated they also became much smaller and lighter, allowing them to be used in many roles. At this time the weapons began to receive designations based on their role; bombs were given the prefix "B", while the same warhead used in other roles, like missiles, would normally be prefixed "W". For instance, the W-53 warhead was also used as the basis for the B53 nuclear bomb. Such examples share the same sequence number.

In other cases, when the modifications are more significant, variants are assigned their own number. An example is the B61 nuclear bomb, which was the parent design for the W80, W81, and W84. There are also examples of out-of-sequence numbering and other prefixes used in special occasions.

This list includes weapons which were developed to the point of being assigned a model number (and in many cases, prototypes were test fired), but which were then canceled prior to introduction into military service. Those models are listed as canceled, along with the year or date of cancellation of their program.

 Bombs – designated with Mark ("Mk") numbers until 1968, and with "B" numbers after that. "Test Experimental" bombs designated with "TX".
 Mark 1 – "Little Boy" gun-type uranium weapon (used against Hiroshima). (13–18 kilotons, 1945–1950)
 Mark 2 – "Thin Man" plutonium gun design—cancelled in 1944
 Implosion Mark 2 – Another Manhattan Project plutonium implosion weapon, a hollow pit implosion design, was also sometimes referred to as Mark 2. Also cancelled 1944.
 Mark 3 – "Fat Man" plutonium implosion weapon (used against Nagasaki), effectively the same as the "Gadget" device used in the Trinity nuclear test with minor design differences. (21 kilotons, 1945–1950)
 Mark 4 – Post-war "Fat Man" redesign. Bomb designed with weapon characteristics as the foremost criteria. (1949–1953)
 Mark 5 – Significantly smaller high efficiency nuclear bomb. (1–120 kilotons, 1952–1963)
 Mark 6 – Improved version of Mk-4. (8–160 kilotons, 1951–1962)
 Mark 7 – Multi-purpose tactical bomb. (8–61 kilotons, 1952–1967)
 Mark 8 – Gun-assembly, HEU weapon designed for penetrating hardened targets. (25–30 kilotons, 1951–1957)

 Mark 10 – Improved version of Mk-8 (12–15 kilotons, cancelled May 1952).
 Mark 11 – Re-designed Mk-8. Gun-type (8–30 kilotons).
 Mark 12 – Light-weight bomb to be carried by fighter aircraft (12–14 kilotons).
 Mark 13 – Improved version of Mk-6 (cancelled August 1954).
 TX/Mark 14 – First deployable solid-fuel thermonuclear bomb (Castle Union device). Only five produced. (5 Megatons)
 Mark 15 – First "lightweight" thermonuclear weapon. (1.7–3.8 Megatons, 1955–1965)
 TX/Mark 16 – First weaponized thermonuclear weapon (Ivy Mike device). Only cryogenic weapon ever deployed. Only five produced. (6–8 Megatons)
 Mark 17 – High-yield thermonuclear. Heaviest U.S. weapon, second highest yield of any U.S. weapon. Very similar to Mk-24. (10–15 Megatons)
 Mark 18 – Very high yield fission weapon (Ivy King device).
 Mark 20 – Improved Mark 13 (cancelled 1954)
 Mark 21 – Re-designed variant of Castle Bravo test
 Mark 22 – Failed thermonuclear design (Castle Koon device, cancelled April 1954).
 Mark 24 – High-yield thermonuclear, very similar to Mk-17 but had a different secondary.
 Mark 26 – Similar design to Mk 21 (cancelled 1956).
 Mark 27 – Navy nuclear bomb (1958–1965)
 Mk 101 Lulu (1958–1971)
 Mk 105 Hotpoint (1958–1965)
 B28 nuclear bomb (Mark 28) (1958–1991)
 Mark 36 – Strategic nuclear bomb (1956–1961) 6–19 Megatons
 B39 nuclear bomb (Mark 39) (1957–1966)
 B41 nuclear bomb (Mark 41) (1960–1976); highest yield US nuclear weapon (25 Megatons).
 B43 nuclear bomb (Mark 43) (1961–1991)
 B46 nuclear bomb or (Mark 46); experimental, design evolved into B53 nuclear bomb and W-53 warhead (cancelled 1958)
 Mark 90 nuclear bomb (1952-1960)
 B53 nuclear bomb (1962–1997; dismantled 2010–2011)
 B57 nuclear bomb (1963–1993)
 B61 nuclear bomb (1966–present)
 B77 nuclear bomb (cancelled 1977)
 B83 nuclear bomb (1983–present)
 B90 nuclear bomb (cancelled 1991)
 Robust Nuclear Earth Penetrator design program (2001–2005, cancelled)
Nuclear artillery shells
 16-inch (406 mm)
 W23 (1956–1962) gun-type
 280 mm, 11-inch:
 W9 (1952–1957) gun-type
 W19 (1953–1956) gun-type, W9 derivative
 8-inch (203 mm)
 W33 (1956–1980s) gun-type
 W75 (cancelled 1973)
 W79 (1981–1992)
 There were/are also nuclear warheads for the Army's 175 mm (6.9-inch) and 155 mm (6.1-inch) artillery.
 W48 (1963–1992)
 W74 (cancelled 1973)
 W82 (cancelled 1983 (W-82-0 Enhanced Radiation) and 1990 (W-82-1 fission only))
Atomic Demolition Munitions
 W7/ADM-B (c. 1954–1967)
 T4 ADM (1957–1963) Gun-type
 W30/Tactical Atomic Demolition Munition (1961–1966)
 W31/ADM (1960–1965)
 W45/Medium Atomic Demolition Munition (1964–1984)
 W54/Special Atomic Demolition Munition (1965–1989)
 Missile and Rocket warheads
 W4 for SM-62 Snark cruise missile (cancelled 1951)
 W5 for MGM-1 Matador cruise missile (1954–1963)
 W7 for MGR-1 Honest John artillery rocket (1954–1960), MGM-5 Corporal TBM (1955–1964), Nike Hercules SAM, and BOAR air-to-surface rocket (ASR) (1958–1960s)
 W8 for SSM-N-8 Regulus cruise missile, Gun-type (cancelled 1955)
 W12 for RIM-8 Talos SAM (cancelled 1955)
 W13 for SM-62 Snark cruise missile and PGM-11 Redstone SRBM (cancelled 1954)
 W15 for SM-62 Snark cruise missile (cancelled 1957)
 W21 for SM-64 Navaho cruise missile (cancelled 1957)
 W25 for MB-1 "Ding Dong", later AIR-2 Genie AAR (1957–1984)
 W27 for SSM-N-8 Regulus and SSM-N-9 Regulus II cruise missile (1958–1965)
 W28 for AGM-28 Hound Dog and MGM-13 Mace cruise missiles (1958–1976)
 W29 for SM-64 Navaho cruise missile, PGM-11 Redstone SRBM, and SM-62 Snark cruise missile (cancelled 1955)
 W30 for RIM-8 Talos SAM (1959–1979)
 W31 for MGR-1 Honest John artillery rocket (1961–1985), Nike Hercules SAM (1960s–1988)
 W34 for Mk 101 Lulu depth charge, Mark 45 ASTOR torpedo, Mk 105 Hotpoint bomb (1958–1976)
 W35 for SM-65 Atlas ICBM, HGM-25A Titan I ICBM, PGM-17 Thor IRBM, and PGM-19 Jupiter MRBM (cancelled 1958)
 W37 (cancelled 1956)
 W38 for SM-65 Atlas ICBM and HGM-25A Titan I ICBM (1961–1965)
 W39 for PGM-11 Redstone SRBM (1958–1964)
 W40 for MGM-18 Lacrosse TBM, CIM-10 Bomarc SAM (1959–1972)
 W41 for SM-64 Navaho cruise missile (cancelled 1957)
 W42 for MIM-23 Hawk SAM, AIM-47 Falcon AAM, AAM-N-10 Eagle AAM  (cancelled 1961)
 W44 for RUR-5 ASROC SSM (1961–1989) 
 W45 for MGR-3 Little John artillery rocket, RIM-2 Terrier SAM, and AGM-12 Bullpup ASM (1961–1969 (some 1988))
 W46 for PGM-11 Redstone SRBM and SM-62 Snark cruise missile (cancelled 1958)
 W47 for UGM-27 Polaris A-1 and A-2 SLBMs (1960–1974)
 W49 for PGM-19 Jupiter MRBM (1959–1963) and PGM-17 Thor IRBM (1959–1963)
 W50 for MGM-31 Pershing SRBM, and Hopi ASR (1960–1990)
 W51 for various (program converted to W54 in 1959)
 W52 for MGM-29 Sergeant TBM (1962–1977)
 W53 for LGM-25C Titan II ICBM (1962–1987)
 W54 for Davy Crockett recoilless rifle, AIM-26 Falcon AAM, and AIM-4 Falcon AAM (1961–1972)
 W55 for UUM-44 SUBROC SSM (1965–1989)
 W56 for LGM-30 Minuteman I and II ICBMs (1963–1993)
 W58 for UGM-27 Polaris A-3 SLBM (1964–1982)
 W59 for LGM-30 Minuteman I ICBM and GAM-87 Skybolt ALBM (1962–1969)
 W60 for RIM-50 Typhon SAM (cancelled 1963)
 W61 for MGM-134 Midgetman (cancelled 1992)
 W62 for LGM-30 Minuteman III ICBM, (1970–2010)
 W63 for MGM-52 Lance TBM (warhead cancelled 1966)
 W64 for MGM-52 Lance TBM (warhead cancelled 1964)
 W65 for Sprint ABM (cancelled 1968)
 W66 for Sprint ABM (available 1970–1975)
 W67 for UGM-73 Poseidon SLBM and LGM-30 Minuteman III ICBM (cancelled 1967)
 W68 for UGM-73 Poseidon SLBM (1970–1991)
 W69 for AGM-69 SRAM ASM (1972–1990)
 W70 for MGM-52 Lance TBM (deployed 1973–1992)
 W71 for LIM-49A Spartan ABM (deployed 1974–1975; dismantled 1992)
 W72 for AGM-62 Walleye glide bomb (1970–1979)
 W73 for AGM-53 Condor ASM (cancelled 1970)
 W76 for UGM-96 Trident I and UGM-133 Trident II SLBMs (1978–present)
 W78 for LGM-30 Minuteman III ICBM (1979–present)
 W80 for AGM-86, AGM-129, BGM-109 Tomahawk, and AGM-181 LRSO cruise missiles (1981–present)
 W81 for RIM-67 Standard ER SAM, based on B61 (cancelled 1986)
 W84 for BGM-109G Gryphon cruise missile (1983–1991)
 W85 for Pershing II MRBM and Pershing 1b SRBM (1983–1991)
 W86 for Pershing II MRBM Earth penetrating warhead option (cancelled 1980)
 W87 for LGM-118 Peacekeeper ICBM (1986–2005), LGM-30 Minuteman III ICBM (2007–present), and LGM-35 Sentinel ICBM (future)
 W87-1 for MGM-134 Midgetman ICBM (cancelled 1992)
 W88 for UGM-133 Trident II SLBM (1988–present)
 W89 for AGM-131 SRAM II ASM and UUM-125 Sea Lance SSM (cancelled 1991)
 W91 for SRAM-T ASM (cancelled 1991)
 Reliable Replacement Warhead (RRW1) design program (2004–2008, cancelled)
 W93 for UGM-133 Trident II SLBM (proposed)

See also Enduring Stockpile.

Common nuclear primaries

Several American weapons designs share common components. These include publicly identified models listed below.

Soviet Union/Russia

At the peak of its arsenal in 1988, Russia possessed around 45,000 nuclear weapons in its stockpile, roughly 13,000 more than the United States arsenal, the second largest in the world, which peaked in 1966.
Tests
 Joe-1
Torpedoes
53-58 torpedo with 10 kilotons RDS-9 warhead
65-73 torpedo with 20 kilotons 
VA-111 Shkval with 150 kilotons
Bombs
RDS-1, 22 kiloton bomb. Tested 29 August 1949 as "First Light" (Joe 1). Total of 5 stockpiled
RDS-2, 38 kiloton bomb. Tested 24 September 1951 as "Second Light." The RDS-2 was an entirely Russian design, delayed by development of the RDS-1
RDS-3, 42 kiloton bomb. First Soviet bomb tested in an airdrop on 18 October 1951. First 'mass-produced" Soviet bomb
RDS-3I, 62 kiloton bomb. Tested 24 October 1954. The RDS-31 was an improved RDS-3 with external neutron generator
RDS-4, "Tatyana" 42 kiloton bomb. The RDS-4 was smaller and lighter than previous Soviet Bombs.
RDS-5
RDS-6, also known as RDS-6S, or "sloika" or 'layer cake" gaining about 20% of its yield from fusion. RDS-6 was tested on 12 August 1953. Yield 400 kilotons
RDS-7, a backup for the RDS-6, the RDS-7 was a 500 kiloton all fission bomb comparable to the US Mk-18, development dropped after success of the RDS-6S
RDS-27, 250 kiloton bomb, a 'boosted' fission bomb tested 6 November 1955.
RDS-37, 1.6 megaton bomb, the first Soviet two-stage hydrogen bomb, tested 22 November 1955
RDS-220 Tsar Bomba an extremely large three stage bomb, initially designed as a 100-megaton-bomb, but was scaled down to 50 megatons for testing.
Intercontinental Ballistic Missiles

RDS-9, 40 kiloton warhead for R-5M MRBM (SS-3)
RDS-37 3 megaton warhead for R7 Semyorka / SS-6 ICBM
RDS-46 5 megaton warhead for R-7A Semyorka / SS-6 ICBM
8F17 3 megaton warhead for R-16 / SS-7 ICBM
8F115 and 8F116 5-6 megaton warhead for R-16 / SS-7 ICBM
Unknown model warheads for R-9 / SS-8 Sasin ICBM
15F42 1.2 megaton warhead for UR 100U / SS-11 Mod 3 Sego ICBM

Unknown model 750 kiloton to 1.0 megaton warhead for RT-2 / SS-13 Mod 1 Savage ICBM
15F1r 750 kiloton to 1.65 megaton warhead for RT-2 / SS-13 Mod 2 Savage ICBM
Unknown model 466 kiloton warhead for RT-2 / SS-13 Mod 3 Savage ICBM
Unknown model 500 kiloton warhead for RT-20 / SS-15 Scrooge ICBM
Unknown model 1.5 megaton warhead for RT-20 / SS-15 Scrooge ICBM
Unknown model 650 kiloton to 1.5 megaton warheads for RT-21 Temp 2S SS-16 Sinner ICBM
Unknown model 300–750 kiloton warheads for MR-UR-100 Sotka / SS-17 Spanker Mod 1 ICBM
Unknown model 4–6 megaton warhead for MR-UR-100 Sotka / SS-17 Spanker Mod 2 ICBM
8F675 (Mod2) 20 megaton warhead for R-36M2 / SS-18 Satan ICBM
8F021 2 or 5 megaton warheads for R-36MP / SS-18 Satan ICBM (3 MIRV warheads)
unknown 550 kiloton warheads for R-36M2 / SS-18 Satan ICBM (10 MIRV warheads)
Unknown model 750 kiloton warheads for R-36M2 / SS-18 Satan ICBM (10 MIRV warheads)
Unknown model 550 kiloton warheads for UR-100N / SS-19 Mod 1 Stiletto ICBM (6 MIRV warheads)
Unknown model 2.5–5 megaton warhead for UR-100N / SS-19 Mod 2 Stiletto ICBM
Unknown model 550 kiloton warheads for RT-23 Molodets / SS-24 Scalpel ICBM (10 MIRV warheads)
Unknown model 550 kiloton warhead for RT-2PM Topol / SS-25 Sickle ICBM
Unknown model 550 kiloton warhead for RT-2UTTH Topol M / SS-27 ICBM

Various tactical nuclear weapons including "suitcase bombs" (RA-115 or RA-115-01 as examples)

United Kingdom

 Blue Steel
 Yellow Sun productionised air-delivered thermonuclear bomb casing.
 Warheads
 Blue Danube Fission weapon.
 Red Snow for Yellow Sun Mk.2.
 Green Grass For Yellow Sun Mk.1.
 Red Beard, tactical nuclear weapon.
 WE.177 (also used as a nuclear depth charge).
 Blue Cat – nuclear warhead a.k.a. Tony - UK version of US W44, a.k.a. Tsetse.
 Blue Fox – kiloton range nuclear weapon, later renamed Indigo Hammer - not to be confused with the later Blue Fox radar.
 Blue Peacock ten-kiloton nuclear land mine,  a.k.a. the "chicken-powered nuclear bomb", originally 'Blue Bunny' It used the Blue Danube physics package.
 Blue Rosette – short-case nuclear weapon bomb casing for reconnaissance bomber to spec R156T, including the Avro 730, Handley Page HP.100, English Electric P10, Vickers SP4 and various others.
 Blue Slug – nuclear ship-to-ship missile using Sea Slug launcher.
 Blue Water – nuclear armed surface to surface missile.
 Green Bamboo – nuclear weapon.
 Green Cheese – nuclear anti-ship missile.
 Green Flash – Green Cheese's replacement.
 Green Granite – nuclear weapons – Green Granite (small) & Green Granite (large).
 Green Grass – nuclear weapon
 Indigo Hammer – nuclear weapon
 Orange Herald – fusion-boosted fission weapon. It is believed that the fusion boost didn't work, which would make it the most powerful fission bomb ever tested at 720 kt.
 Violet Club – nuclear weapon

France

France is said to have an arsenal of 350 nuclear weapons stockpiled as of 2002.

Bombs
AN 11
AN 22
AN 52 (MR 50 CTC)
Warheads (and missiles)
MR 31 (S2)
MR 41 (M1 and M2)
MR 50 CTC (AN 51 CTC and AN 52 CTC)
AN 51 CTC (Pluton)
AN 52 CTC (AN 52)
TN 60 (M20)
TN 61 (M20 and S3)
TN 70 MIRV (M4)
TN 71 MIRV (M4)
TN 75 MIRV (M45 and M51)
TN 76 MIRV (M5)
TN 80 (ASMP)
TN 81 (ASMP)
TN 90 (Hàdes)
TNA (ASMP-A)
TNO MIRV (M51)

China

China is believed to possess around 250 nuclear weapons, but has released very little information about the contents of its arsenal.
Tests:
596 (nuclear test)
Test No. 6
Ballistic Missiles:
DF-1
DF-2
DF-3A
DF-4
DF-5
DF-11
DF-15
DF-21
DF-31
DF-31B
DF-41
JL-1
JL-2
B-611
P-12
Cruise Missiles
DH-10
CJ-10
HN1
HN2
HN3
CF-2
CF-1
SS-N-2

India

Although India's nuclear programme and its details are highly classified, international figures suggest that India possesses about 150 nuclear weapons, with enough weapons-grade plutonium for another 150–200 nuclear weapons (2020 estimate). In 1999, India was estimated to have 800 kg of separated reactor-grade plutonium, with a total amount of 8,300 kg of civilian plutonium, enough for approximately 1,000 nuclear weapons.

Israel

Israel is widely believed to possess a substantial arsenal of nuclear weapons and missiles, estimated at 75–130 and 100–200 warheads, but refuses officially to confirm or deny whether it has a nuclear weapon program, leaving the details of any such weapons unclear. Mordechai Vanunu, a former nuclear technician for Israel, confirmed the existence of a nuclear weapons program in 1986.

Unconfirmed rumors have hinted at tactical nuclear artillery shells, light fission bombs and missile warheads, and perhaps thermonuclear missile warheads.

The BBC News Online website published an article on 28 May 2008, which quotes former U.S. President Jimmy Carter as stating that Israel has at least 150 nuclear weapons.  The article continues to state that this is the second confirmation of Israel's nuclear capability by a U.S. spokesman following comments from U.S. Defense Secretary Robert Gates at a Senate hearing and had apparently been confirmed a short time later by Israeli Prime Minister Ehud Olmert.

Pakistan

As of June 2019, Pakistan is believed to possess about 160 nuclear weapons. The specifications of its weapon production are not disclosed to the public.
The main series for nuclear transportation is Hatf (lit. Target).

North Korea

North Korea claims to possess nuclear weapons, however, the specifications of its systems are not public. It is estimated to have 6–18 low yield nuclear weapons (August 2012 estimate). On 9 October 2006, North Korea achieved its first nuclear detonation.

On 25 May 2009, North Korea conducted a second test of nuclear weapons at the same location as the original test. The test weapon was of the same magnitude as the atomic bombs dropped on Japan in the 2nd World War. At the same time of the test, North Korea tested two short range ballistic missiles.  The country tested a 7 kt nuclear weapon on 2 February 2013. On 3 September 2017, North Korea conducted an underground thermonuclear test which had an estimated yield of 100kt to 250kt, according to various sources.

South Africa

South Africa built six or seven gun-type weapons.  All constructed weapons were verified by International Atomic Energy Agency and other international observers to have been dismantled, along with the complete weapons program, and their highly enriched uranium was reprocessed back into low enriched form unsuitable for weapons.

See also
Lists of nuclear disasters and radioactive incidents
Nuclear weapon yield
Nuclear weapon
Nuclear bunker buster

References

Bibliography
 Holloway, David, Stalin and the Bomb, New Haven & London, Yale University Press, 1994, .
 Zaloga, Steven J., The Kremlin's Nuclear Sword Washington, D.C., Smithsonian Institution Press, 2002, .
Hansen, Chuck. U.S. Nuclear Weapons. Arlington, Texas, Areofax, Inc., 1988. .
Gibson, James N. Nuclear Weapons of the United States, Altglen, PA, Schiffer Publishing, 1996, .
 Cochran, Thomas, Arkin, William, Hoenig, Milton "Nuclear Weapons Databook, Volume I, U.S. Nuclear Forces and Capabilities," Cambridge, Massachusetts, Ballinger Pub. Co., 1984, .
 Hansen, Chuck, "Swords of Armageddon" (CD-ROM & download available). PDF. 2,600 pages, Sunnyvale, California, Chucklea Publications, 1995, 2007.  (2nd Ed.)

External links
 – indicates that "most international experts conclude that South Africa has completed its nuclear disarmament. South Africa is the first and to date only country to build nuclear weapons and then entirely dismantle its nuclear weapons program."

Lists of weapons
 
Weapons